Alin Florin Cioancă (born 1 April 1995) is a Romanian cross-country skier. He competed in the 2018 Winter Olympics.

References

1995 births
Living people
Cross-country skiers at the 2018 Winter Olympics
Romanian male cross-country skiers
Olympic cross-country skiers of Romania